is a mountain with a height of , west of Broadford on the Isle of Skye, Scotland. It is one of the Red Hills, or Red Cuillin. There is another Beinn na Caillich at Kyle Rhea on Skye, with an identical height.

History and folklore
The summit is adorned by an especially large cairn, reputedly marking the site where Saucy Mary, a Norwegian princess and former resident of Castle Moil in Kyleakin, is buried. Local legend claims that she was buried at the top of the mountain so that she could face the land of her birth forever. An alternative version of events suggests the monument was dedicated to "a gigantic woman in the days of Fingal". Thomas Pennant climbed the hill while staying with Mackinnon of Corriechatachan (or Corry); Samuel Johnson and James Boswell did not.

On the eastern slopes is Goir a' Bhlàir, "the field of battle". The battle concerned was apparently a decisive action by the Gaelic Clan Mackinnon against the Norsemen

References

External links
Early descriptions of Skye from the Scottish Mountaineering Club Journal Volume 5 Number 5

Mountains and hills of the Isle of Skye
Grahams
Marilyns of Scotland